Bongolwethu Siyasi (born 22 September 2002) is a South African soccer player playing as a defender for Venda, on loan from Mamelodi Sundowns.

Club career
Born in Khayelitsha, Western Cape, Siyasi began his career with amateur sides Chumisa FC and YBC FC, before a move to Ajax Cape Town in 2014, where he was lauded by coach Duncan Crowie as one of the best players in the young team. He left Ajax Cape Town in January 2021 by mutual consent.

Returning to football in 2022 with Mamelodi Sundowns, he made his debut in the Carling Black Label Cup in November 2022. In January 2023, he was loaned to Motsepe Foundation Championship side Venda.

International career
Siyasi has represented South Africa at under-17 level.

Career statistics

Club

Notes

References

2002 births
Living people
Soccer players from the Western Cape
South African soccer players
South Africa youth international soccer players
Association football defenders
National First Division players
Cape Town Spurs F.C. players
Mamelodi Sundowns F.C. players